Kim Joon-beom may refer to:
 Kim Joon-beom (footballer, born 1986)
 Kim Joon-beom (footballer, born 1998)